Henry Erik Leppä (born 12 March 1947) is a retired professional ice hockey player who played in the SM-liiga. He played for Jokerit and TuTo.  He was inducted into the Finnish Hockey Hall of Fame in 1996. Leppä was born in Turku, Finland.

Career statistics

External links
 Finnish Hockey Hall of Fame bio

1947 births
Living people
Finnish ice hockey players
Ice hockey players at the 1976 Winter Olympics
Jokerit players
Olympic ice hockey players of Finland
Sportspeople from Turku
TuTo players